The 1927 Marshall Thundering Herd football team was an American football team that represented Marshall College (now Marshall University) in the West Virginia Athletic Conference during the 1927 college football season. In its third season under head coach Charles Tallman, the team compiled a 5–3–1 record, 4–1 against conference opponents, and outscored opponents by a total of 194 to 75.

Schedule

References

Marshall
Marshall Thundering Herd football seasons
Marshall Thundering Herd football